The Florida College Hockey Classic (formerly the Everblades College Classic) was a college Division I men's ice hockey tournament played annually between 2000 and 2016 in the week between Christmas and New Years at the Germain Arena in Estero, Florida, United States.

First contested in 2000, the four-team tournament was initially jointly hosted by Cornell University and the University of Maine with the remaining slots filled by invitation.  In January 2014, after 14 years of participating, Maine announced it was ending its affiliation with the tournament.  Florida Everblades owner Craig Brush said that a second host school would be found although this never happened and Cornell hosted alone for the remaining years of the tournament.

The tournament champion was awarded the Ned Harkness Cup, named for the coach that won two NCAA Titles with Cornell and one with Rensselaer Polytechnic Institute.  The tournament MVP was awarded the Shawn Walsh Memorial Trophy, named for the coach that took Maine to two NCAA titles.

The final edition of the Florida College Hockey Classic took place December 28 and 29, 2016.  In the first round match-ups Cornell defeated Northern Michigan University 5-2 and Colorado College defeated Merrimack College 3-0. Colorado College defeated Cornell 2-1 in overtime in the championship game while Merrimack defeated Northern Michigan 4-2 for third place. This was Colorado College's second appearance at the tournament and first title.

Yearly results

Team records

*at the time of tournament participation

References

College sports in Florida
Cornell Big Red ice hockey
Maine Black Bears ice hockey
College ice hockey tournaments in the United States
Ice hockey competitions in Florida
Recurring sporting events established in 2000
2000 establishments in Florida